are a mountain range in Nagano and Gifu prefectures in Japan.

Outline 
The mountain range consists of granite. The Komagatake Ropeway is on the east side of Mount Kisokoma. A lot of tourists visit the station on the top. The upper part of the mountain range is the tree line, and a lot of alpine plants grow naturally. Leontopodium shinanense of Leontopodium is endemic around Mount Kisokoma.

Geography

Major peaks 

Foothills
Mount Nenjō (念丈岳), 
Mount Nagiso (南木曽岳), 
Mount Kazakoshi (Kiso) (風越山), 
Mount Kazakoshi (Ena) (風越山),

Rivers
Rivers with headwaters in the Kiso Mountains drain to Ise Bay of the Pacific Ocean. They include:
 Kiso River
 Tenryū River

See also
Japanese Alps
Hida Mountains (Northern Alps)
Akaishi Mountains (Southern Alps)
List of mountains in Japan

References

External links

 
Japan Alps
Mountain ranges of Gifu Prefecture
Mountain ranges of Nagano Prefecture